This is a list of the peaks along the Georgia portion of the Appalachian Trail starting at Springer Mountain.  Almost seventy-six miles of the Appalachian Trail (AT) is in Georgia, where it mostly follows ridges, but does climb a few peaks, including the sixth and seventh highest points in Georgia (Blood Mountain and Tray Mountain).

Peaks

External links
Georgia Appalachian Trail Club trail description

Georgia
Georgia, Appalachian Trail
Georgia, Appalachian Trail

Peaks on Appalachian Trail
Protected areas of Fannin County, Georgia
Protected areas of Union County, Georgia
Protected areas of Lumpkin County, Georgia
Protected areas of White County, Georgia
Protected areas of Towns County, Georgia
Protected areas of Rabun County, Georgia
Appalachian Trail